(lit. "Beside the Sea"/ "Seaside"), previously spelled , is a coastal area west of Galway city, where the Irish language is the predominant language (a ). There are between 8,000 and 9,000 people living in this area. 

The area is most often included within the definition of Connemara, but some say that Connemara does not come as far south as the Galway Bay coast.

, a Gaeltacht village, is regarded by some as a suburb of Galway City due to its proximity, but there are still Irish speakers in its hinterland, and it still retains its Gaeltacht status.  is majority Irish speaking and is the tourism centre of the region.

References

 

Gaeltacht places in County Galway
Irish dialects